Haunt is a synonym for ghost.

Haunt may also refer to: 


Film
 Haunt (2013 film), an American supernatural horror film
 Haunt (2019 film), an American slasher film

Music
 Haunt (band), a heavy metal band from Fresno, California
 Haunt (EP), a 2013 EP by Bastille
 "Haunt", a song by Banks from her album The Altar

Video games
 HAUNT, a 1979 computer game
 Haunt (video game), a 2012 video game

Other uses
 Haunt (comics), a comic book character and series

See also
 Halloween Haunt (disambiguation)
 Haunts (disambiguation)
 Haunted (disambiguation)
 Haunter (disambiguation)
 The Haunting (disambiguation)